The Arkaquah Trail is a hiking trail that has been designated as a National Recreation Trail in Georgia. The trail is 5.5 miles (8.25 km) long (not including the trail from the parking area to the summit and back) and is located in the Chattahoochee National Forest in the Brasstown Ranger District.  The trail is managed by the U.S. Forest Service.

The trail starts at Brasstown Bald and descends along the northern spur of ridge called Locust Log Ridge to Track Rock Gap.  There are a number of scenic viewpoints along the Arkaquah Trail.  The first five miles (8 km) of the trail are located within the Brasstown Wilderness and the trail ends at Track Rock, one of the best-known of the petroglyph sites in Georgia.  There is parking at both ends of the trail.

External links
Arkaquah Trail: Hiking Brasstown Bald to Track Rock Gap (atlantatrails.com trail review)
 Arkaquah Trail entry in the National Recreational Trail Database
Arkaquah Trail profile on GeorgiaTrails.com
 Garmin Adventures Mepwoods Arkaqua Trail Brasstown Bald 2012

Hiking trails in Georgia (U.S. state)
National Recreation Trails in Georgia (U.S. state)
Protected areas of Union County, Georgia
Chattahoochee-Oconee National Forest